Meadville Area Senior High School (MASH) is a public school located within the city of Meadville, Pennsylvania, United States. Situated at 930 North Street Ext., the high school serves the city of Meadville, West Mead Township, Vernon Township and is part of the Crawford Central School District. In the 2017–2018 school year, the total enrollment for grades 9 through 12 was 914.

The school's mascot is the bulldog and its colors are red and black.

Extracurriculars
Students may participate in a wide range of clubs and organizations including student government, National Honor Society, ski club, marching band, jazz band, the school newspaper known as The Bark’. 

Notable alumni
Meghan Allen – adult model; Playboy Cyber Girl of the Month, appeared in Fear Factor''
Journey Brown – former running back at the Pennsylvania State University, MVP of the 2019 Cotton Bowl
Todd Erdos – Major League Baseball player
Randy Fichtner – offensive coordinator for the Pittsburgh Steelers
Todd Holland – television and film director and producer
Raymond P. Shafer – former Governor of Pennsylvania
Michael S. Smith – jazz drummer and percussionist

References

Public high schools in Pennsylvania
Schools in Crawford County, Pennsylvania
Meadville, Pennsylvania